James Riley Fridley (September 6, 1924 – February 28, 2003) was an American professional baseball player. During his Major League Baseball career, he was a backup outfielder, playing mostly at left field for three different teams between 1952 and 1958. He was born in Philippi, West Virginia.

After finishing high school, Fridley worked briefly for the FBI and later served in the U.S. Army for four years during World War II. Following his service discharge, he attended West Virginia University on a football scholarship, playing both for the WVU baseball and football teams. He was signed by the Cleveland Indians as a free agent in 1948, playing for them one year (1952) before joining the Baltimore Orioles (1954) and Cincinnati Redlegs (1958). His most productive season came in 1954, when he posted career-highs in games (85), runs (25), RBI (36) and extrabases (17).

In a three-season career, Fridley was a .248 hitter (105-for-424) with eight home runs and 53 RBI in 152 games, including 50 runs, 12 doubles, five triples, three stolen bases, and a .309 on-base percentage. In 123 outfield appearances, he posted a collective .982 fielding average (four errors in 228 chances). He also played in the minor league systems of the New York Yankees, Brooklyn Dodgers and Detroit Tigers. 
 
Fridley died in Port Charlotte, Florida at age 78.

On the records
On April 29, 1952, Fridley went 6-for-6 for the Indians in a 21-9 rout of the Philadelphia A's at Shibe Park.
Before the 1955 season, in the largest transaction in major league history, Baltimore sent Fridley along Mike Blyzka, Billy Hunter, Darrell Johnson, Dick Kryhoski, Don Larsen and Bob Turley to the Yankees, in exchange for Harry Byrd, Don Leppert, Jim McDonald, Bill Miller, Willy Miranda, Kal Segrist, Hal Smith, Gus Triandos, Gene Woodling and Ted Del Guercio. Del Guercio played 12 seasons in the minor leagues and was the only member of the group not to make the majors.

See also
List of Major League Baseball single-game hits leaders

External links

1924 births
2003 deaths
United States Army personnel of World War II
Military personnel from West Virginia
Ardmore Rosebuds players
Baltimore Orioles players
Baseball players from West Virginia
Burlington Indians players (1947–1949)
Cincinnati Redlegs players
Cleveland Indians players
Dallas Eagles players
Dayton Indians players
Denver Bears players
Houston Buffs players
Indianapolis Indians players
Little Rock Travelers players
Los Angeles Angels (minor league) players
Major League Baseball outfielders
Mobile Bears players
Nashville Vols players
Navegantes del Magallanes players
American expatriate baseball players in Venezuela
People from Philippi, West Virginia
Richmond Virginians (minor league) players
San Antonio Missions players
Spartanburg Peaches players
Federal Bureau of Investigation agents
Victoria Rosebuds players
West Virginia Mountaineers football players